Christian Grascha (born 16 October 1978 in Einbeck) is a German politician for the Free Democratic Party.

Political career
Grascha joined the Lower Saxon Landtag in 2008 as a replacement for Stefan Birkner.

In the negotiations to form a so-called traffic light coalition of the Social Democratic Party (SPD), the Green Party and the FDP following the 2021 federal elections, Grascha was part of his party's delegation in the working group on financial regulation and the national budget, co-chaired by Doris Ahnen, Lisa Paus and Christian Dürr.

Other activities
 Norddeutsche Landesbank (NORD/LB), Member of the Advisory Board

References

External links 

 Personal website 

Free Democratic Party (Germany) politicians
Members of the Landtag of Lower Saxony
1978 births
Living people